Eternal Black Dawn is the sixth studio album of the American heavy metal band Omen. It was originally released in 2003 by Crash Music Inc. Since 1997 and their last studio album, Reopening the Gates, Omen had changed vocalists, with Kevin Goocher replacing Greg Powell.

Track listing

Personnel
Omen
 Kevin Goocher – vocals
 Kenny Powell – guitars
 Andy Haas – bass
 Rick Murray – drums

Production
 Kenny Powell – production

References

Omen (band) albums
2003 albums
Mausoleum Records albums